Pristerognatha is a genus of moths belonging to the subfamily Olethreutinae of the family Tortricidae.

Species
Pristerognatha agilana (Clemens, 1860)
Pristerognatha fuligana ([Denis & Schiffermuller], 1775)
Pristerognatha penthinana (Guenee, 1845)

See also
List of Tortricidae genera

References

External links
tortricidae.com

Tortricidae genera
Olethreutinae